CIPAMEX, more fully La Sociedad para el Estudio y Conservación de las Aves en México, is a Mexican ornithological non-profit organization, with its principal objective the study and conservation of Mexican birds and their habitats.  It publishes the journal Huitzil in electronic format.  CIPAMEX was established in 1947, formally constituted in 1988, and is a member of the Ornithological Council.

Previous and current presidents 

 Dr. Enrique Beltrán Castillo
 Dr. Mario Ramos Olmos (1988-1992)
 Dra. Patricia Escalante ( 1992–1997)
 Dra. María del Coro Arizmendi (1997-2001) 
 M. en C. Mauricio Quezada (2001-2005)
 Dr. Raúl Ortiz-Pulido (2005-2009)
 Dra. Katherine Renton (2009-213)
 Dr. Fernando Villaseñor (2013-2017)
 Dr. Leonardo Chapa Vargas (2017-2021)

References
 CIPAMEX

External links
 Huitzil

Ornithological organizations
Nature conservation in Mexico
Animal welfare organizations based in Mexico
Environmental organizations based in Mexico
Scientific organizations based in Mexico
Environmental organizations established in 1988
Scientific organizations established in 1988
1988 establishments in Mexico